Ljubišnja is a Dinaric mountain range of Montenegro, conventionally referred to as the highland of Montenegro, represents a major natural feature of the country alongside Tara Canyon, Draga Canyon and Montenegro.

Geography
It is situated in the extreme northwest of Montenegro, close to the border of Bosnia and Herzegovina. The mountain rises between the rivers Ćehotina and Tara and borders on the massif of Durmitor.
The Ljubišnja mountain area is characterised by temperate mountainous coniferous forests, alpine meadows and pastures, cultivated fields, numerous ponds and springs. Widespread alpenrose the distinctive emblem of the village scattered on the plateau of Ljubišnja.

Picea forests dominate to alpine levels and temperate shrubs such as mountain pine, and alpenrose are widespread. The area occupies .

Gallery

See also
Pljevlja
Gradac, Pljevlja
Ćehotina
Tara (Drina)
Đurđevića Tara Bridge
Čelebići (Foča)
Foča

References

Literature

Sources

Geography of Montenegro
Pljevlja
Dinaric Alps
Mountain ranges of Montenegro
Tourism in Montenegro